Mesomyzon mengae is an extinct lamprey from freshwater strata of the Early Cretaceous-aged Yixian Formation, in China.  So far, M. mengae is the only lamprey known from post-Paleozoic fossils.

The animal's exquisitely preserved fossils show a creature very similar to modern-day lampreys, having a well-developed sucking oral disk, a branchial basket, at least seven pairs of gill pouches and corresponding gill arches, impressions of gill filaments, and at least 80 myomeres of its musculature.

A phylogenetic analysis conducted in 2018 shows that Mesomyzon is the fossil lamprey most closely related to modern taxa, though it is not closely related to any modern group. On the other hand, Brownstein & Near (2022) found it to be a member of the lamprey crown group, most closely related to northern lampreys.

References

Prehistoric Hyperoartia genera
Lampreys
Mesozoic jawless fish
Cretaceous fish
Barremian genus first appearances
Early Cretaceous fish of Asia
Aptian genus extinctions